Electra Nicole Mustaine (born January 28, 1998) is an American musician. The daughter of heavy metal musician Dave Mustaine, she was raised in Fallbrook, California and currently resides in Nashville, Tennessee.

Family 
Mustaine is the daughter of Dave Mustaine, lead vocalist of Megadeth, and Pamela Anne Casselberry. She was born in Scottsdale, Arizona on January 28, 1998, six years after her older brother, Justis.

Career 
Mustaine moved to Fallbrook, California, at age five and started pursuing a career in musical theater at age seven. She began to practice singing in hopes of one day becoming a prominent figure in the world musical theater and acting.

Mustaine was co-host of Animal Planet's TV show, Faithful Friends "Itty Bitty Buddy" segment with WWE wrestler Bill Goldberg's wife, Wanda. She would continue to frequent Los Angeles for auditions and acting classes. As Mustaine built her voice, her love for music began to flourish above all else. That's when her family started to support her pursuit of a musical career. Mustaine began performing at fairgrounds and small gigs and venues around San Diego County and in Chicago. In 2013, she performed a cover of her father's band's song "A Tout le Monde" by Megadeth on Seattle's KING-TV and having a benefit concert for the Ward 57 Wounded Warrior Project to raise funds for wounded veterans and their families.

In 2016, Mustaine released her cover of "I Thought I Knew It All", a Megadeth song from the album Youthanasia, and her first original composition, "Life Is Good" written by Mustaine, Nathan Chapman, and Blair Daly. She also performed at the 2016 CMA Music Festival.

Discography

References

External links 
 Official website
 

American women country singers
American country singer-songwriters
Country musicians from California
American people of Canadian descent
American people of Jewish descent
American people of German descent
American people of Irish descent
American people of French descent
American people of Finnish descent
1998 births
Living people
People from Fallbrook, California
21st-century American singers
21st-century American women singers